Al-Da'i is an Arabic monthly Islamic journal issued from Darul Uloom Deoband, under the editorship of Shaikh Waheed-Zaman Kiranwai in 1976. The main focus of the journal are dignitaries of Darul Uloom Deoband and its graduates only. Due to its uniqueness, it has attracted the attention of scholars from India and the Arab world. The journal is curated by Abul Qasim Nomani and Muhammad Arif Jamil Qasmi is the Editor-in-Chief. Noor Alam Khalil Amini was a notable editor of this journal.

Reception 
Qasim Yusuf al-Shaykh, an Islamic scholar from Bahrain, praised the magazine, saying that, "We are immensely happy to read some issues of your excellent Islamic papers where we have found the spirit of Islam and an enlightening thought of belief. We became more happy when we found articles about Muhammad Tayyib Qasmi, the head of Islamic University at Deoband and other great reformers."

References

Citations

Bibliography

External links
 Some issue of AL-DAIE
Monthly journals
Publications established in 1976
Darul Uloom Deoband
Deobandi journals